BT Riverside Tower was built in 1998, as a headquarters of British Telecom for Northern Ireland. The Tower is located at Lanyon Place in Belfast City Centre. The building is currently the 7th tallest building in Belfast.
Moving in to the building in late 1999 and early 2000, BT staff occupied all 11 floors until 2008. Some floor space is now occupied by other tenants, including AXA insurance and the Regulation and Quality Improvement Authority. BBC drama Line of Duty now uses the sixth floor as the set for Anti-Corruption Unit 12's offices, with the original BT room numbers visible outside meeting room doors.

See also
List of tallest buildings and structures in Belfast
List of tallest structures in Ireland

References

Buildings and structures in Belfast
British Telecom buildings and structures
Towers in Northern Ireland
Skyscrapers in Northern Ireland
Skyscraper office buildings in the United Kingdom